Alan Andrew Watson, FRS, (born 26 September 1938 in Edinburgh) is physicist and an emeritus professor at the University of Leeds, England.

Education
Watson was educated at the University of Edinburgh (BSc 1960 first class honours in physics) and was awarded the degree of PhD in 1964 for his thesis on the physics of condensation of water vapour: Examination and possible exploitation of certain unexplored features in the operation of high pressure cloud chambers. His main areas of interest were high-energy cosmic rays, ultra high-energy gamma rays and high-energy astrophysics.

Career
Watson was professor of physics at the University of Leeds from 1984, having previously been reader in particle cosmic physics there, and retired in 2003 with the title emeritus professor.

Watson was instrumental in the creation of the Pierre Auger Observatory in Argentina (begun 1999) which gathered the data that led to major discoveries in cosmic-ray astronomy. The observatory covers an area of 3000 square km with 1,600 particle detectors each placed at  intervals. Watson was serving as the spokesperson of the Pierre Auger collaboration and was later given the title of Spokesperson Emeritus.

Awards and honours
Watson was elected a Fellow of the Royal Society (FRS) in 2000.

He was awarded the Institute of Physics Michael Faraday Medal and Prize in 2011.

References

1938 births
Living people
British physicists
20th-century British astronomers
Fellows of the Royal Society
Academics of the University of Leeds
Alumni of the University of Edinburgh
Cosmic ray physicists
Scientists from Edinburgh